Sycamore is a city in Turner County, Georgia, United States. The population was 711 at the 2010 census.

History
The Georgia General Assembly incorporated Sycamore as a town in 1891. The community was named for the American sycamore trees near the original town site.

Geography

Sycamore is located at  (31.670810, -83.633871).

Demographics

As of the census of 2010, there were 711 people, 191 households, and 131 families residing in the city. The racial makeup of the city was 61.7% White, 35.9% African American, 0.6% American Indian and Alaska Native, 1.81% from other races, and 0% from two or more races. Hispanic or Latino of any race were 2.8% of the population.

There were 191 households, out of which 29.3% had children under the age of 18 living with them, 52.9% were married couples living together, 10.5% had a female householder with no husband present, and 31.4% were non-families. 23.6% of all households were made up of individuals, and 10.8% had someone living alone who was 65 years of age or older.  The average household size was 2.61 and the average family size was 3.11.

In the city, the population was spread out, with 21.2% under the age of 20, 11.4% from 10 to 24, 34.4% from 25 to 44, 22.4% from 45 to 64, and 10.5% who were 65 years of age or older.  The median age was 33.3 years. For every 100 females, there were 189 males.  For every 100 females age 18 and over, there were 214 males.

As of the census of 2010, the median income for a household in the city was $19,063, and the median income for a family was $23,750. Males had a median income of $23,750 versus $17,143 for females. The per capita income for the city was $12,346.  About 14.4% of families and 25.8% of the population were below the poverty line, including 30.3% of those under age 18 and 30.9% of those age 65 or over.

Climate
The climate in this area is characterized by relatively high temperatures and evenly distributed precipitation throughout the year.  According to the Köppen Climate Classification system, Sycamore has a humid subtropical climate, abbreviated "Cfa" on climate maps.

Notable people
 Clay Pirkle - Georgia House of Representatives, elected in 2015

 Thomas Creekmore- Entertainer and innovator of the “Creekmore Stomp”.

References

Cities in Georgia (U.S. state)
Cities in Turner County, Georgia